Gatun Lake is a large freshwater artificial lake to the south of Colón, Panama. Gatun Lake was "officially" created June 27, 1913 when the gates of the spillway at Gatun Dam were finally closed, and the world waited for the lake to fill.

Construction
Created in 1913 by damming the Chagres River, Gatun Lake is a key part of the Panama Canal, providing the millions of litres of water necessary to operate its locks each time a ship passes through. At time of formation, Gatun Lake was the largest human-made lake in the world. The impassable rainforest around the lake has been the best defense of the Panama Canal. Today these areas remain practically unscathed by human interference and are one of the few accessible areas where various native Central American animal and plant species can be observed undisturbed in their natural habitat.

Supplementary benefits

The largest island on Gatun Lake is Barro Colorado Island. It was established for scientific study when the lake was formed, and is operated by the Smithsonian Institution. Many important scientific and biological discoveries of the tropical animal and plant kingdom originated here. Ecotourism on the lake has become an industry for Panamanians.

Gatun Lake also provides drinking water for Panama City and Colón.

Fishing

Angling is one of the primary recreational pursuits on Gatun Lake. Non-native peacock bass were introduced by accident to Gatun Lake around 1967 by a local businessman, and have since flourished to become the dominant angling game fish in Gatun Lake. Locally called Sargento and believed to be the species Cichla pleiozona, these peacock bass originate from the Amazon, Rio Negro, and Orinoco river basins. Although considered a premier game fish in their natural range, the introduction of the peacock bass to Gatun Lake had devastating effects on the local species. According to a report by the Smithsonian,  native fish populations in the lake still have not recovered.  Only one quarter the number of native fish species were found in a sampling taken in 2016.

Notes

References 
 History Of The Panama Canal, by Ira E. Bennett
 The Panama Canal, by Colonel George W. Goethals

Panama Canal
Lakes of Panama
Reservoirs in Panama
Colón Province
Bifurcation lakes
1913 establishments in Panama